Live At Mainstreet is the 1983 album by the New Zealand band The Dance Exponents, recorded live at a May performance at the  Mainstreet Cabaret for the Radio with Pictures TV show. The B side of the album has songs by The Legionnaires. The album charted at #3 and spent nine weeks on the New Zealand Album Chart. In May 2013, Universal Music re-released the six Dance Exponents tracks  as a digital only Live At Mainstreet EP.

Track listing
Side 1
 "Airway Spies"		
 "Perfect Romance"		
 "My Date With You Was A Date With No One"		
 "All I Can Do"		
 "Gone Forever In Another Car"		
 "Poland"
	
Side 2
 "I'm A Texan" (The Legionnaires)	
 "No Mystery"  (The Legionnaires)	
 "Billy Bold"  (The Legionnaires)	
 "Blue Lady"  (The Legionnaires)

Band members
Jordan Luck (vocals)
Brian Jones (guitar)
David Gent (bass guitar)
Michael "Harry" Harallambi (drums)

Charts

Weekly charts

Year-end charts

References

External links
 Live on Mainstreet (TV performance)
 Exponents official albums page

1983 live albums
The Exponents albums